Malt was an unincorporated community located in LaRue County, Kentucky, United States. Its post office  is closed.

References

Unincorporated communities in LaRue County, Kentucky
Unincorporated communities in Kentucky